Kiełpino may refer to the following places:
Kiełpino, Pomeranian Voivodeship (north Poland)
Kiełpino, Choszczno County in West Pomeranian Voivodeship (north-west Poland)
Kiełpino, Gryfice County in West Pomeranian Voivodeship (north-west Poland)
Kiełpino, Szczecinek County in West Pomeranian Voivodeship (north-west Poland)